Isaac Pupo (born October 23, 1985) is a Liberian footballer (midfielder) who plays for Watanga FC. He also played for Liberia national football team.

In August 2007 Pupo signed for FK Qarabağ in the Azerbaijan Premier League on a one-year contract. Whilst with Qarabağ, Pupo won the player of the month and attracted interest from several Turkish sides, namely Denizlispor, Trabzonspor and Gençlerbirliği OFTAŞ.  After one season with Qarabağ, and the club apparently unwilling to match Pupo's wage demands, Pupo signed for newly promoted Azerbaijan Premier League side NBC Salyan.

After his stint in Azerbaijan, Pupo signed for Greek top-flight team Panionios FC on a five-year contract. But he left the club after only one full season. Panionios'  financial problems was told to be the main reason for his exit.

In the summer of 2011, on the 28th of July, he signed for the Swedish club Hammarby IF. A team based in the capital Stockholm, playing in the second tier, Superettan. He signed a short-term contract with the club, with an option of an additional three years.

He lastly played for Kelantan FA

References

External links 
 Isaac Pupo at Qarabagh.com
 

1985 births
Living people
Sportspeople from Monrovia
Liberian footballers
Liberia international footballers
Association football midfielders
Super League Greece players
Azerbaijan Premier League players
Superettan players
Qarabağ FK players
Panionios F.C. players
Hammarby Fotboll players
FK Mughan players
LPRC Oilers players
Monrovia Club Breweries players
Kelantan FA players
Persebaya Surabaya players
Watanga FC players
Liberian expatriate footballers
Expatriate footballers in Azerbaijan
Expatriate footballers in Greece
Expatriate footballers in Sweden
Expatriate footballers in Indonesia
Expatriate footballers in Malaysia
Liberian expatriate sportspeople in Azerbaijan
Liberian expatriate sportspeople in Greece
Liberian expatriate sportspeople in Sweden
Liberian expatriate sportspeople in Indonesia
Liberian expatriate sportspeople in Malaysia